Zumarraga or Zumárraga may refer to:  

Zumarraga, Samar, the Philippines
Zumarraga, Spain
Juan de Zumárraga, the first bishop in Mexico